Moadamiyet al-Sham media centre (also known as the Moadamiya media center) is a Syrian opposition-run media centre, operating from the town of Muadamiyat al-Sham located about  southwest of Damascus.

Notable work
In August 2013, they documented the chemical attack on Western Ghouta and the following U.N. fact-finding missions activities in the area.

External links
 YouTube-channel mrkzmoadamia alsham
 YouTube-channel  المركز الإعلامي .معضمية الشام
 Google+

References

News agencies based in Syria